José Francisco 'Txetxu' Rojo Arroitia (28 January 1947 – 23 December 2022), also known as Rojo I, was a Spanish football player and coach. During his career the forward played solely for Athletic Bilbao, in a professional spell which spanned nearly 20 years. He was one of the club's most iconic players, and later also worked as a coach with the team. Rojo was given the nickname the "Mozart of football" by composer Carmelo Bernaola.

Club career
Born in Bilbao, Biscay, Rojo joined local giants Athletic Bilbao's youth ranks at an early age. In 1965 he started playing for its reserves but, after only three appearances, was promoted to the first team, and stayed there until his professional retirement 17 years later.

Rojo made his La Liga debut on 26 September 1965 in a 1–0 away loss against Córdoba CF, and helped Athletic to win two Copa del Rey trophies in 1969 and 1973. He played a total of 414 games in the Spanish top flight, becoming the player with the second-most appearances in the Basque side's history, only behind José Ángel Iribar; for several seasons he shared teams with younger brother José Ángel, with the pair being thus referred to as 'Rojo I' and 'Rojo II'.

International career
Rojo played 18 times for Spain, his debut coming on 26 March 1969 in a friendly with Switzerland held in Valencia. During his nine years as an international he scored three goals, but never took part in any major international tournament; he and his brother José Ángel appeared together in a friendly with Turkey on 17 October 1973, in the latter's sole cap.

Coaching career
In 1982, aged 35, Rojo retired as a footballer and began a coaching career – a testimonial match was held in his honour, with Athletic Bilbao hosting the England national team. His first managerial experience would be with the former's reserves, and he was promoted to first-team duties early into the 1989–90 campaign, being sacked at its conclusion.

After a four-year spell at RC Celta de Vigo from 1991 to 1994, achieving promotion to the top level in his second season, Rojo returned to the second division for the next three years, coaching CA Osasuna and UE Lleida. For 1997–98 he was appointed at UD Salamanca, helping the modest club retain its first division status, and the following season he joined Real Zaragoza, leading them to the fourth place in 2000 – but failed to qualify for the UEFA Champions League because of a controversial decision to instead award their place to Real Madrid, winners of the 1999–2000 UEFA Champions League.

Rojo returned to Bilbao for one season, but moved back to Zaragoza for another season and then left again, being replaced by Luis Costa on 22 January 2002 after a 4–2 away loss against Sevilla FC, and ultimately being relegated from the top level. He then took a sabbatical year, subsequently joining Rayo Vallecano in division two and again dropping down a tier.

Personal life and death
Rojo died on 23 December 2022, at the age of 75, in Leioa, Biscay.

Athletic Bilbao released the following statement upon his death:
"There are not enough words in the world to describe Txetxu Rojo and what he means for our Club. Those who enjoyed his unique style on the left wing for 17 seasons will remember the amazing runs, the surgical and unexpected passes, exquisite controls, beautiful goals, but, above all, the aura of an inimitable footballer, an artist, a creator of beauty, perhaps lacking in the brawn of other Athletic legends, but nonetheless possessing the enormous heart of a Lion.
Although Txetxu's heart has stopped beating in his mortal body, it will continue to beat forever in the hearts of our fans."

Career statistics
Scores and results list Spain's goal tally first, score column indicates score after each Rojo goal.

Honours

Player
Athletic Bilbao
Copa del Generalísimo: 1969, 1972–73; runner-up 1965–66, 1966–67, 1976–77
UEFA Cup: runner-up 1976–77

Manager
Celta
Segunda División: 1991–92

See also
 List of Athletic Bilbao players (+200 appearances)
 List of La Liga players (400+ appearances)
List of one-club men in association football

References

External links
 
 
 
 Athletic Bilbao manager profile
 
 

1947 births
2022 deaths
Spanish footballers
Footballers from Bilbao
Association football forwards
La Liga players
Bilbao Athletic footballers
Athletic Bilbao footballers
Spain youth international footballers
Spain under-23 international footballers
Spain international footballers
Basque Country international footballers
Spanish football managers
La Liga managers
Segunda División managers
Athletic Bilbao B managers
Athletic Bilbao managers
RC Celta de Vigo managers
CA Osasuna managers
UE Lleida managers
UD Salamanca managers
Real Zaragoza managers
Rayo Vallecano managers